All Around My Hat may refer to:

 "All Around My Hat" (song)
 All Around My Hat (album), a 1975 album by Steeleye Span